Jibla or Jiblah may refer to:
 Jibla, Kuwait, a historic area of Kuwait City
 Jibla, Yemen, a town in south-western Yemen, close to Ibb

See also 
 Jableh, a Syrian city on the coast of the Mediterranean